Tommaso Carafa (1588 – 7 December 1664) was a Roman Catholic prelate who served as Bishop of Capaccio (1639–1664) and Bishop of Vulturara e Montecorvino (1623–1637).

Biography
Tommaso Carafa was born in 1588. On 20 November 1623, he was appointed during the papacy of Pope Urban VIII as Bishop of Vulturara e Montecorvino. On 26 November 1623, he was consecrated bishop by Cosimo de Torres, Cardinal-Priest of San Pancrazio, with Paolo Emilio Santori, Archbishop of Urbino, and Giuseppe Acquaviva, Titular Archbishop of Thebae, serving as co-consecrators. He served as Bishop of Vulturara e Montecorvino until his resignation in 1637. On 11 July 1639, he was appointed during the papacy of Pope Urban VIII as Bishop of Capaccio. He served as Bishop of Capaccio until his death on 7 December 1664.

Episcopal succession
While bishop, he was the principal co-consecrator of:

See also
Catholic Church in Italy

References

External links and additional sources
 (for Chronology of Bishops) 
 (for Chronology of Bishops) 
 (for Chronology of Bishops) 
 (for Chronology of Bishops) 

17th-century Italian Roman Catholic bishops
Bishops appointed by Pope Urban VIII
1588 births
1664 deaths